The Piano Sonata in C-sharp minor, Op. posth. 80, was written by Russian composer Pyotr Ilyich Tchaikovsky in 1865, his last year as a student at the St Petersburg Conservatory. The sonata in its original form was not published in Tchaikovsky's lifetime; it was published in 1900 by P. Jurgenson, and given the posthumous opus number 80.

Tchaikovsky transposed and orchestrated the third movement of the sonata to create the scherzo of his Symphony No. 1 in G minor, Op. 13.

Movements 

 Allegro con fuoco (C-sharp minor) 
 Andante (A major) 
 Allegro vivo (C-sharp minor) 
 Allegro vivo (C-sharp minor) 

The sonata ends in the tonic major, in the enharmonic spelling of D-flat major.

References

 Tchaikovsky Research

External links 

Compositions by Pyotr Ilyich Tchaikovsky
Tchaikovsky
1865 compositions
Compositions in C-sharp minor
Compositions by Pyotr Ilyich Tchaikovsky published posthumously